Kal pri Krmelju is a small settlement in the Municipality of Sevnica in central Slovenia. The area is part of the historical region of Lower Carniola. The municipality is now included in the Lower Sava Statistical Region.

Name
The name of the settlement was changed from Kal to Kal pri Krmelju in 1955.

Church
The local church is dedicated to Saint Martin and belongs to the Parish of Šentjanž. It was first mentioned in written documents dating to 1526.

References

External links
Kal pri Krmelju at Geopedia

Populated places in the Municipality of Sevnica